Donato Lovreglio (6 December 1841, in Bari – May 1907, in Naples) was an Italian flautist and composer, mainly of music for his own instrument and other woodwinds.  He was a native of Bari, and later moved to Naples, where he died.  Among his compositions are numerous concert fantasies and arrangements of themes from a number of Giuseppe Verdi's operas, including Simon Boccanegra, Don Carlos, and La traviata.

References
 
Biography

1841 births
1907 deaths
Date of death missing
Italian flautists
Italian composers
Italian male composers
People from Bari
19th-century Italian musicians
19th-century Italian male musicians